Jean-Pierre Egger (born 30 July 1943) is a Swiss athlete. He competed in the men's shot put at the 1976 Summer Olympics and the 1980 Summer Olympics.

References

External links
 

1943 births
Living people
Athletes (track and field) at the 1976 Summer Olympics
Athletes (track and field) at the 1980 Summer Olympics
Swiss male shot putters
Olympic athletes of Switzerland
Place of birth missing (living people)